Güroluk is a neighborhood of Başkale district in Van Province, Turkey.

Geography 
It is 122 km from Van and 5 km from Başkale.

Population

References 

Villages in Van Province